The 2016 Breeders' Cup Challenge series provided winners of the designated races an automatic "Win and You're In" Berth in the 2016 Breeders' Cup. Races were chosen by the Breeders' Cup organization and included key prep races in the various Breeders' Cup divisions from around the world.

Summary
A total of seven races were added to the Challenge series in 2016. Four were added in April when the initial announcement was made: the Queen of the Turf (which replaced the Queen Elizabeth Stakes), the Gran Premio Club Hipico Falabella, the Gran Premio Pamplona and the Flying Five Stakes. Three more races from Japan were added in June: the February Stakes, the Yasuda Kinen and the Sprinter Stakes.

Forty-five entrants in the 2016 Breeders' Cup qualified via the Challenge series, which was particularly important in 2016 as seven of the Breeders' Cup races were oversubscribed. A maximum of 14 horses (12 in the Dirt Mile) are allowed to start in each race. Winners of the Challenge races were given automatic entries, while other pre-entries were ranked by a points system and the judgement of a panel of experts.

Two Challenge series winners went on to win their respective division at the Breeders' Cup:
 Highland Reel, who qualified for the Turf by winning the King George VI and Queen Elizabeth II stakes
 Classic Empire, who won the Breeders' Futurity Stakes to qualify for the Juvenile

A few Challenge series winners could not compete at the Breeders' Cup due to illness, injury or retirement. Exaggerator, who qualified for the Classic by winning the Haskell, was retired in October. Cavorting, who qualified for two Breeders' Cup races, developed some bone bruising and was also retired in October. The Gurkha, who qualified for the Mile by winning the Sussex Stakes, suffered a ruptured colon and was retired. In the Sprint, both Joking and Lord Nelson were scratched due to late injuries.

Winners
The winners of the 2016 Breeders' Cup Challenge series races are shown below. The last column shows if the winner was subsequently entered in the corresponding Breeders' Cup race, and if so, whether they achieved a top three placing.

References

Breeders' Cup Challenge
Breeders' Cup Challenge series
Breeders' Cup